Robert-Casimir Tonyui Messan Dosseh-Anyron (13 October 1925 – 15 April 2014) was a Togolese Catholic archbishop. He was ordained as a priest of Lomé on 21 December 1951. He became Archbishop of Lomé on 10 June 1962, a position which he served until his resignation on 13 February 1992.

References

Togolese Roman Catholic bishops
1925 births
2014 deaths
Roman Catholic archbishops of Lomé
21st-century Togolese people